Muhammad Nazirul Afif bin Ibrahim (born 30 April 1997) is a Malaysian footballer who plays as a right-back for Malaysian Super League club Perak FC.

References

External links
 

Living people
Malaysian footballers
Malaysia Super League players
Perak F.C. players
PKNP FC players
Association football defenders
1997 births